The 2010 European Men's and Women's Team Badminton Championships was held in Warsaw, Poland, from February 16 to February 21, 2010. This tournament also serves as European qualification for the 2010 Thomas & Uber Cup.

Medalists

Men's team

Final stage

Final

Women's team

Final stage

Final

References

External links
2010 European Men's and Women's Team Badminton Championships - Tournament Software

European Men's and Women's Team Badminton Championships
European Men's and Women's Team Badminton Championships
Badminton tournaments in Poland
2010 in Polish sport
International sports competitions hosted by Poland